Brass Monkeys is an Australian sitcom that screened in 1984 on the Seven Network. The series was produced by Gary Reilly and Tony Sattler, who are known for comedy series Kingswood Country and Hey Dad!. The title comes from the colloquial expression "cold enough to freeze the balls off a brass monkey", in reference to the cold climate of the Antarctic.

Brass Monkeys is the story of a pretty female doctor who joins a group of men confined to the lonely isolation of an Australian Antarctic expedition station.

Cast
 Graeme Blundell as Noddy
 Paul Chubb as Big Eye
 Kevin Golsby as OIC
 Ross Hohnen as Rex
 Margie McCrae as Dr. Sally Newman
 Colin McEwan as Nick
 Doug Scroope as  Cookie
 Bill Young as  Martin Lightfoot

References

External links
 

Australian television sitcoms
Seven Network original programming
1984 Australian television series debuts